The Basketball competition in the 1959 Summer Universiade was held in Torino, Italy. Only men's event was held.

Men's competition

Final standings

External links
https://web.archive.org/web/20100116184920/http://sports123.com/bsk/mun.html
https://www.fisu.net/sports/summer-games-sports/basketball (Participants and match details)

References 

 Results (torod66.com)

Basketball
Summer Universiade
1959
Universiade